The Antigo Public Library and Deleglise Cabin comprise a historic site in Antigo, Wisconsin. The library building is a Carnegie library built in 1904. In 1997, the Antigo Public Library left the building; it is now a museum and the headquarters of the Langlade County Historical Society. The Deleglise Cabin, the first home in Antigo, was constructed by George Eckart in 1878 on the Springbrook and inhabited by Francis A. Deleglise. The cabin was moved near the library in 1916. Both buildings were added to the National Register of Historic Places on December 18, 1978.

F. A. Deleglise, a man of vision and courage, came to the area in 1877 when Langlade County was still a part of Oconto. His was the first house, a log cabin. Our forefathers had the foresight to preserve this first home and had it moved to the site of the public library, now the home of the Langlade County Historical Society Museum.

The Deleglise Cabin was completely restored with the surveyor's office and kitchen lean-tos added on. It is available for viewing on the museum grounds.

References

External links
 Langlade County Historical Society Museum

Houses on the National Register of Historic Places in Wisconsin
Libraries on the National Register of Historic Places in Wisconsin
Colonial Revival architecture in Wisconsin
Houses completed in 1878
Library buildings completed in 1904
Houses in Langlade County, Wisconsin
Museums in Langlade County, Wisconsin
Historical society museums in Wisconsin
Carnegie libraries in Wisconsin
National Register of Historic Places in Langlade County, Wisconsin